Stanley Alves (born June 30, 1996) is an American soccer player who plays as a forward for USL League One club Richmond Kickers.

Career

College and amateur
Alves played four years of college soccer at the University of Massachusetts Lowell between 2016 and 2019, although missing the 2017 season due to injury. During his time with the River Hawks, Alves made 52 appearances, scoring 13 goals and tallying 4 assists. He was also a two-time America East All-Conference selection and a 2019 All-Region honoree.

Whilst at college, Alves spent time in the USL PDL and NPSL with Seacoast United Phantoms in 2016 and 2017, as well as a single appearance in the now renamed USL League Two in 2019. Alves also played a single game with Boston Bolts in 2018.

In 2019, Alves also played with New England Revolution's under-23's team.

Professional
On January 10, 2020, Alves signed with the Richmond Kickers of the USL League One. He made his professional debut on August 30, appearing as a 54th-minute substitute during a 2–1 win over Greenville Triumph SC. He scored his first professional goal on October 21, netting in a 3–1 over Orlando City B.

Personal
Alves was born in Boston, Massachusetts, but his family is from Brazil. He also speaks fluent Portuguese.

References

External links
 Dean College profile
 UMass Lowell profile
 

1996 births
Living people
American soccer players
Association football forwards
People from Watertown, Massachusetts
Richmond Kickers players
Seacoast United Phantoms players
Sportspeople from Middlesex County, Massachusetts
Soccer players from Massachusetts
UMass Lowell River Hawks men's soccer players
USL League One players
USL League Two players